Nadia Petrova and Meghann Shaughnessy were the defending champions, but Shaughnessy did not compete this year. Petrova teamed up with Elena Bovina and lost in semifinals to tournament winners Anastasia Myskina and Vera Zvonareva.

Myskina and Zvonareva won the title by defeating Virginia Ruano Pascual and Paola Suárez 6–3, 4–6, 6–2 in the final.

Seeds

Draw

Draw

Qualifying

Qualifying seeds

Qualifiers
  Yuliana Fedak /  Mariya Koryttseva

Qualifying draw

External links
 Official results archive (ITF)
 Official results archive (WTA)

Kremlin Cup
Kremlin Cup